This is a list of lighthouses in Saint Kitts and Nevis.

Lighthouses

See also
 Lists of lighthouses and lightvessels

References

External links
 

Saint Kitts and Nevis
Lighthouses